Vierville is a former commune in the Manche department in Normandy in north-western France. On 1 January 2019, it was merged into the commune Carentan-les-Marais.

Places and monuments
 Mounds Neolithic of Butte (historical monument). Cemetery dating to the Merovingian.
 Church Saint-Eloi (XV), with font emblazoned (XVI).
 Castle (XVIII), listed in the inventory of historical monuments (IMH).
 Fontaine Saint-Eloi and laundry.
 Manoir de Tourville (XVII).

See also
Communes of the Manche department

References

Former communes of Manche